Matt Frahm (born March 16, 1990) is an American professional stock car racing driver. The North Salem, New Hampshire, resident has competed in the NASCAR Xfinity Series and K&N Pro Series East.

Racing career

Early years
Frahm began racing at the age of 14. His first major breakthrough came when he started competing in the Pro All Stars Series, in which he ran a limited schedule in 2010. He has also ran in the Granite State Pro Stock Series, capturing three wins before 2014 and grabbed another victory in the second race of the 2014 season.

K&N Pro Series East
In 2010, Frahm ran three of the ten races, running a race at Martinsville Speedway and both races at New Hampshire Motor Speedway. Receiving funding from The Woodworks, he posted finishes of eighth at Martinsville, 29th at the June New Hampshire race after a radiator failure, and 19th in the September New Hampshire race.

Xfinity Series

Frahm made his Xfinity debut in 2011, where he made three starts for Go Green Racing in the No. 39 car. He had one crash, at Phoenix International Raceway. He posted finishes of 26th at New Hampshire and 25th at Lucas Oil Raceway. In 2012, he made a career-high six starts. One, at Richmond International Raceway, was for Go Green. His next start, at Darlington Raceway, was for Randy Hill Racing. The next week at Iowa Speedway, Frahm drove the No. 42 car for Curtis Key and The Motorsports Group. After that, Frahm made three more starts for RHR. He start and parked for two, at Road America and Kentucky Speedway. His best finish came in the one that he did not start and park in, a 25th at New Hampshire. Frahm's next start came at New Hampshire in 2014, driving TriStar Motorsports' No. 44 Toyota Camry. He matched his 2012 finish with another 25th. Frahm would attempt three more races that season with The Motorsports Group. In his first race for TMG, at Iowa, his No. 46 finished last as a start-and-park entry. Three races later, he failed to make the field at Bristol. In his final attempt of the season, at Richmond, he finished 39th. In 2015, Frahm attempted two races with Jimmy Means Racing as a field-filler. He also made one start in the No. 70 for Derrike Cope Racing. Unsponsored for all three of those races, he completed one race, driving for Cope at Iowa, where he was scored 31st.

Frahm tested with Bryan Dauzat and Brother-In-Law Racing in an ARCA Racing Series car at Daytona International Speedway before the 2018 season, posting a top-ten time the first day.

Motorsports career results

NASCAR
(key) (Bold – Pole position awarded by qualifying time. Italics – Pole position earned by points standings or practice time. * – Most laps led.)

Xfinity Series

K&N Pro Series East

References

External links
 

1990 births
Living people
People from Salem, New Hampshire
NASCAR drivers
Racing drivers from New Hampshire
Sportspeople from Rockingham County, New Hampshire